is a 2005 Japanese release consisting of five short films by different directors, each based on a short story by a popular Japanese woman writer and focusing on the nature of women's sexuality.

Details
The five sections are as follows:

Momo (Peaches)
Based on a story by Kaoruko Himeno, directed by Tetsuo Shinohara and starring Kyōko Hasegawa, Hiroyuki Ikeuchi and Eri Nomura.

Taiyo no Mieru Basho Made (Drive Until you See the Sun)
Based on a story by Yuzuki Muroi, directed by Ryuichi Hiroki and starring Chihiro Otsuka, Mitsuko Ishii and Hairi Katagiri.

Yoru no Shita (Licking Nights)
Based on a story by Kei Yuikawa, directed by Suzuki Matsuo and starring Saki Takaoka.

Megami no Kakato (Heels of the Muse)
Based on a story by Asa Nonami, directed by Miwa Nishikawa and starring Nene Otsuka and Naoyuki Morita.

Tamamushi (Jewel Beetle)
Based on a story by Mariko Koike, directed by Shinya Tsukamoto and starring Eri Ishida, Ryō Kase and Kaoru Kobayashi.

Reception
The film was reviewed positively by critic Russell Edwards for Variety as a celebration of modern womanhood and sexuality in Japan.

References

External links 
 

2005 films
2000s Japanese-language films
Films directed by Miwa Nishikawa
Films directed by Ryūichi Hiroki
Films directed by Shinya Tsukamoto
Films directed by Tetsuo Shinohara
Japanese anthology films
2000s Japanese films